Kensington Gravel Pits was an old village located at the junction of what are now known as Bayswater Road and Kensington Church Street. This area is now known as Notting Hill Gate. The village was named after gravel quarries located to between the village and the town of Kensington.

References

Kensington
Notting Hill